EnterpriseAlumni is a US-based multinational software corporation that makes enterprise software to manage corporate Alumni & Retirees of large organizations. The company was co-founded in 2016 by Emma Sinclair and James Sinclair. James Sinclair exited the company and a majority of his holding in August 2022 via a secondary market transaction.

History 
SAP aimed to launch a formal Alumni Network in 2016 in an effort to drive recruitment of Gen Z employees, in late 2015 SAP asked custom enterprise software developer EnterpriseJungle to develop the platform atop SAP's custom PaaS "SAP Cloud Platform" and it was launched by SAP CEO Bill McDermott in a press release.

In 2017 EnterpriseJungle rebranded as EnterpriseAlumni and came to market with existing SAP customers Lufthansa and Bechtel

Competitors 
EnterpriseAlumni competitors include PeoplePath, Avature, Salesforce, alumniEX, and ServiceNow's Alumni Service Center.

References

Software companies based in California
Software companies established in 2016
Alumni associations
Human resource management software
Software companies of the United States